Stokes County is a county located in the U.S. state of North Carolina. As of the 2020 census, the population was 44,520. Its county seat is Danbury.

Stokes County is included in the Winston-Salem, N.C., Metropolitan Statistical Area, which is also included in the Greensboro-Winston-Salem-High Point, N.C., Combined Statistical Area.

History

The county was formed in 1789 from Surry County, and before 1770, it was part of Rowan County. It was named for John Stokes, an American Revolutionary War captain severely wounded when British Colonel Banastre Tarleton's cavalry practically destroyed Col. Abraham Buford's Virginia regiment in the Waxhaws region in 1780.  After the war, Captain Stokes was appointed a judge of the United States district court for North Carolina. In 1849 the southern half of Stokes County became Forsyth County.

Stokes was most heavily settled from 1750 to 1775. The Great Wagon Road passed through the eastern portion of the county, and this influenced the pattern of European settlement so that most settlers came from the Virginia Piedmont, and some came from further away in Pennsylvania and other colonies.

During the American Civil War, Moratock Iron Furnace located near Danbury served as a foundry for the Confederate Army. It was destroyed in April 1865 when Union cavalry under the command of General George Stoneman conducted extensive raiding through the region.

Hanging Rock State Park was formed primarily from blocks of land donated in 1936 and contained  in 2005. Many of the facilities in the park were built by the Civilian Conservation Corps between 1935 and 1942. The park is located atop the Sauratown Mountains, and contains a visitor's center, a manmade lake, and plenty of hiking trails, climbing trails, picnic areas, and primitive campgrounds.

Geography

The county lies within the Piedmont region of western North Carolina, and most of the terrain consists of gently rolling countryside. The county is part of Appalachia, though, and the Sauratown Mountains run across the center of the county. The Sauras are named after the Saura Native American tribe which lived in the county before European settlement. A chain of jagged ridges, the Sauratown Mountains are an isolated remnant of the Blue Ridge Mountains far to the west. The Dan River runs from the northwest corner to the southeastern section of Stokes County (covering over 56 miles of river recreation). Stokes County is home to Hanging Rock State Park and also has the vast majority of Belews Lake (located in the southeast corner).

Climate and weather

The climate in Stokes County can be described as mixed-humid, with the Köppen Climate Classification subtype being Cfa. In the county seat of Danbury an average of 39.73" of rain and 9.0" of snow falls per year. A three-day accumulated snowfall record of 34.0" was set during the Blizzard of 1996.

State and local protected areas 
 East Walnut Cove Community Park
 Hanging Rock State Park

Major water bodies 
 Belews Creek
 Belews Lake
 Big Beaver Island Creek
 Big Creek
 Buffalo Creek
 Crooked Creek
 Dan River
 Flat Shoal Creek (Ararat River tributary)
 Little Dan River
 Little Neatman Creek
 Little Peters Creek
 Little Yadkin River
 Mill Creek
 Neatman Creek
 Oldfield Creek (Ararat River tributary)
 Peters Creek
 Pinch Gut Creek
 Snow Creek
 Vade Mecum Creek

Adjacent counties
 Patrick County, Virginia - north
 Henry County, Virginia - north
 Rockingham County - east
 Forsyth County - south
 Surry County - west

Major highways

  (Concurrency with US 52)

Demographics

2020 census

As of the 2020 United States census, there were 44,520 people, 19,578 households, and 13,348 families residing in the county.

2000 census
As of the census of 2000, there were 44,712 people, 17,579 households, and 13,043 families residing in the county.  The population density was 99 people per square mile (38/km2).  There were 19,262 housing units at an average density of 43 per square mile (16/km2).  The racial makeup of the county was 93.43% White, 4.66% Black or African American, 0.24% Native American, 0.19% Asian, 0.05% Pacific Islander, 0.88% from other races, and 0.54% from two or more races.  1.87% of the population were Hispanic or Latino of any race.

There were 17,579 households, out of which 33.80% had children under the age of 18 living with them, 60.60% were married couples living together, 9.70% had a female householder with no husband present, and 25.80% were non-families. 22.80% of all households were made up of individuals, and 8.90% had someone living alone who was 65 years of age or older.  The average household size was 2.51 and the average family size was 2.94.

In the county, the population was spread out, with 24.50% under the age of 18, 7.30% from 18 to 24, 31.40% from 25 to 44, 25.00% from 45 to 64, and 11.80% who were 65 years of age or older.  The median age was 37 years. For every 100 females there were 96.10 males.  For every 100 females age 18 and over, there were 92.60 males.

The median income for a household in the county was $38,808, and the median income for a family was $44,615. Males had a median income of $30,824 versus $24,319 for females. The per capita income for the county was $18,130.  About 6.90% of families and 9.10% of the population were below the poverty line, including 10.00% of those under age 18 and 15.90% of those age 65 or over.

Government and politics

Government 
Stokes County is a member of the Piedmont Triad Council of Governments, a regional voluntary association of 12 counties. Stokes County government is made up of five elected County Commissioners with an appointed County Manager, Clerk to the Board of County Commissioners, Finance Director, and Tax Administrator.

Stokes County lies within the bounds of the 23rd Prosecutorial District, the 17B Superior Court District, and the 17B District Court District.

Politics 

Stokes is at present a powerfully Republican county. The last Democratic presidential nominee to carry Stokes County was Jimmy Carter in 1976, and no Democrat since 1980 has reached forty percent of the county's vote. Hillary Clinton barely cracked twenty percent in 2016, receiving a proportion smaller than Hubert Humphrey obtained in the three-way 1968 race. In earlier years Stokes swung from Democratic-leaning during the Third Party System to Republican enough to be alongside Yadkin and Surry as the only North Carolina counties to stick with William Howard Taft during his disastrous 1912 campaign, back to Democratic enough to support Adlai Stevenson II in 1952. In the November 2020 elections, Republican candidates across the county took between 70 to 80 percent of the vote.

Economy
Stokes County has long been a "bedroom community" or "commuter town" for larger towns surrounding, such as Winston-Salem, Greensboro, Mount Airy, etc.  Stokes County has struggled with economic development for several reasons such as infrastructure. The leaders in the county understand this and are working to create new opportunities and upgrades to enhance growth.  Several medium and small businesses have found success in Stokes, as well as retail stores, restaurants, and service professionals.  The largest employer in the county is the government/school system.

Education 
Stokes County is served by Stokes County Schools, which supports 11 elementary schools, 3 middle schools, and 5 high schools, including an early college.

Communities

Cities
 Danbury (county seat)
 King (largest city, city also in Forsyth County)

Town
 Walnut Cove

Village
 Tobaccoville (also in Forsyth County)

Census-designated places
 Germanton
 Pinnacle

Unincorporated communities

 Aarons Corner
 Asbury
 Boyles Chapel
 Brook Cove
 Brown Mountain
 Campbell
 Capella
 Ceramic
 Chestnut Grove
 Collinstown
 Dalton
 Delta
 Dillard
 Dodgetown
 Flat Rock
 Flat Shoals
 Francisco
 Gap
 Hartman
 Lawsonville
 Meadows
 Moores Springs
 Mountain View
 Mount Olive
 Neatman
 Oak Ridge
 Pine Hall
 Poplar Springs
 Prestonville
 Quaker Gap
 Rosebud
 Sandy Ridge
 Volunteer
 Westfield

Townships

 Beaver Island
 Big Creek
 Danbury
 Meadows
 Peters Creek
 Quaker Gap
 Sauratown
 Snow Creek
 Yadkin

See also
 List of counties in North Carolina
 National Register of Historic Places listings in Stokes County, North Carolina
 North Carolina State Parks
 List of future Interstate Highways

References

External links

 
 
 Visitors Information
 Stokes County Historical Society
 Stokes Arts Council
 NCGenWeb Stokes County - free genealogy resources for the county

 
Counties of Appalachia
1789 establishments in North Carolina
Populated places established in 1789